Midway often refers to:
Midway (fair), a place at a fair or circus where rides, entertainment, and booths are concentrated
Midway Atoll, also called Midway Island, a low-lying coral atoll in the central Pacific Ocean
Naval Air Facility Midway Island

Midway may also refer to:

Military
Battle of Midway, a pivotal World War II battle fought around, on, and in the air above the Midway atoll
USS Midway (AG-41) a cargo ship and troop transporter 
Midway-class aircraft carrier, a class of aircraft carrier named for the Battle of Midway
USS Midway (CV-41), a retired U.S. Navy aircraft carrier

Places

Canada
Midway (Music Hall), a music venue in Edmonton, Alberta
Midway, British Columbia, a village in the West Kootenay region
Midway, New Brunswick, in Harvey Parish, New Brunswick
The Midway, Toronto, a former unincorporated community annexed by Toronto in 1909

United Kingdom
Midway, Derbyshire, a suburb of Swadlincote, South Derbyshire

United States
Midway International Airport, in Chicago, Illinois
Midway, Alabama (disambiguation), multiple places
Midway, Arizona (disambiguation), multiple places
Midway, Arkansas (disambiguation), multiple places
Midway, California (disambiguation), multiple places
Midway, Colorado, an unincorporated community in El Paso County
Midway, Delaware, an unincorporated area in Sussex county
Midway, Florida (disambiguation), multiple places
Midway, Georgia, a city in Liberty County
Midway-Hardwick, a former community in Baldwin County, Georgia
Midway, Illinois (disambiguation), multiple places
Midway, Indiana (disambiguation), multiple places
Midway, Iowa (disambiguation), multiple places
Midway, Kansas (disambiguation), multiple places
Midway, Kentucky (disambiguation), multiple places
Midway, Louisiana (disambiguation), multiple places
Midway, Minnesota (disambiguation), multiple places
Midway, Mississippi (disambiguation), multiple places
Midway, Missouri (disambiguation), multiple places
Midway, Nebraska, on the Great Platte River Road
Midway, New Mexico, census-designated place in Chaves County
Midway, North Carolina, an incorporated town in Davidson County
Midway, Brunswick County, North Carolina, on North Carolina Highway 211
Midway, Ohio, a village in Range Township, Madison County
Midway, Oklahoma, an unincorporated community in Oklahoma
Midway, Oregon (disambiguation), multiple places
Midway, Pennsylvania (disambiguation), multiple places
Midway, South Carolina, on South Carolina Highway 903
Midway, South Dakota, in Minnehaha County
Midway, Tennessee (disambiguation), multiple places
Midway, Texas, a city in Madison County
Midway, Smith County, Texas, an unincorporated community in Smith County, Texas
Midway, Utah, a city in Wasatch County
Midway, Virginia (disambiguation), multiple places
Midway, Washington, on the Washington State Route 516
Midway, West Virginia (disambiguation), multiple places
Midway, Wisconsin, an unincorporated community in  La Crosse County
Midway University, an independent, liberal arts college in Midway, Kentucky
Midway Dragway, an eighth-mile drag race facility in South Carolina
Midway Geyser Basin, part of the geothermal areas of Yellowstone
Midway Mountain, a summit in California
Midway State Park, Maple Springs, New York

People
Midway (artist), Dutch music producer Ralphie B

Arts, entertainment, and media

Fictional entities
Midway City, a fictional city in Big Bang's Knight Watchman comics

Games
Midway (1964 game), a board wargame by Avalon Hill based on the battle
Midway (1991 game), a revised version of the 1964 board wargame by Avalon Hill
Midway Campaign, a 1980 computer game about the battle published by Avalon Hill
Midway Games, a video game developer and publisher
 Midway Manufacturing, Midway Games' former identity as a pinball and arcade game manufacturer

Other arts, entertainment, and media
Midway (1976 film), an American film about the battle, directed by Jack Smight
Midway (2019 film), an American film about the battle, directed by Roland Emmerich
"Midway" (Stargate Atlantis), an episode of Stargate Atlantis
"Midway", a song by Sabaton from Coat of Arms

See also

The Battle of Midway
 
 
Medway (disambiguation)
Middle way (disambiguation)
Midway Airlines (disambiguation)
Midway Airport (disambiguation)
Midway City (disambiguation)
Midway Drive-In (disambiguation)
Midway Station (disambiguation), stations of the name
Midway Township (disambiguation)
The Battle of Midway (disambiguation)